Horizons/East is the eleventh studio album by American rock band Thrice. The album was released on September 17, 2021.

Track listing

Personnel
 Dustin Kensrue 
 Teppei Teranishi 
 Eddie Breckenridge 
 Riley Breckenridge

References

2021 albums
Thrice albums
Epitaph Records albums